David Hastings may refer to:

 David Hastings (Passions), a character on the American soap opera Passions
 David Hastings (politician), American politician and lawyer from Maine
 David de Hastings, Earl of Atholl jure uxoris